The following is a timeline of the history of the city of Dijon, France.

Prior to 20th century

 c.274 - Roman emperor Aurelian surrounds the town with ramparts.
 c.500 –  
 c.580 – Description of Dijon by Gregory of Tours in Historia Francorum (Book III, Chapter 19).
 1098 – Cîteaux Abbey founded near Dijon.
 1137 – Fire.
 1182 - Hugh III, Duke of Burgundy confers communal privileges on the town.
 1183 - Philip II of France confirms the communal privileges.
 1200 – Dijon mustard introduced (approximate date).
 1334 - Church of Notre-Dame of Dijon consecrated.
 1364 -  built.
 1382 - Public clock installed.
 1383 - Carthusian Champmol monastery founded near Dijon.
 1393 - Dijon Cathedral consecrated.
 1405 - "Well of Moses" sculpture created for the Champmol monastery near Dijon.
 1460 –  built.
 1491 – Printing press in operation.
 1513 – Siege of Dijon by 50,000 Swiss and Germans.
 1595 - The town opened is gates to Henry IV of France
 1683 - Birth of Jean-Philippe Rameau, later a composer and music theorist.
 1708 – Public library opens.(fr)
 1709 –  built.
 1722 – University of Dijon founded.
 1731 – Roman Catholic diocese of Dijon established.
 1740 – Académie des Sciences, Arts et Belles-Lettres de Dijon constituted.
 1763 – Jesuits expelled.
 1784 - Birth of François Rude, later a sculptor.
 1787 – Musée des Beaux-Arts de Dijon established.
 1790 – Dijon becomes part of the Côte-d'Or department.
 1793 – Population: 20,760.
 1802 –  demolished.
 1828 – Grand Theatre built.
 1832 – Burgundy Canal and  open.
 1833 – Jardin botanique de l'Arquebuse (garden) established.
 1858 – Dijon Exhibition held.
 1863 –  in business.
 1868 – Le Bien Public newspaper in publication.
 1870 – October: .
 1879 –  built.
 1886 – Population: 60,855.
 1893 –  (school) opens.

20th century

 1911 – Population: 76,847.
 1914 –  opens.
 1920 –  opens.
 1934 – Stade Gaston Gérard (stadium) opens.
 1938 – Magnin Museum established.
 1946 – Population: 100,664.
 1947 – Rude Museum established.
 1956 –  opens.
 1962 – Gare de Dijon-Ville rebuilt.
 1970 – University of Burgundy established.
 1973 - , etc. created.
 1975 – Population: 151,705.
 1977 – Palais des Sports de Dijon (arena) opens.
 1980
 Florissimo flower show begins.
 Musée d'art sacré de Dijon opens.
 1990 –  (amusement park) opens.
 1995 –  begins.
 1998
  opens.
 Dijon FCO football club formed.

21st century

 2003 – May: Socialist Party national congress held in Dijon.
 2005 – Zénith de Dijon assembly hall opens.
 2009 – Elithis tower office building constructed.
 2010 – November: Hostel fire.
 2012
 Dijon tramway begins operating.
 Population: 152,071.
 2014
 March:  held.
 21 December: 2014 Dijon attack.
 2015
 François Rebsamen becomes mayor.
 December:  held.
 2016 – Dijon becomes part of the Bourgogne-Franche-Comté region.
 2020 – 11–17 June: 2020 Dijon riots

See also
 Dijon history
 
 
 History of Burgundy region

other cities in the Bourgogne-Franche-Comté region
 Timeline of Besançon

References

This article incorporates information from the French Wikipedia.

Bibliography

in English

in French
 
 
 
 
 
  circa 1896

External links

 Items related to Dijon, various dates (via Europeana).
 Items related to Dijon, various dates (via Digital Public Library of America).

dijon